Delhi Public School (also known as DPS) is the largest public school institution in India. The classes are from KG I to Class XII (Science, Arts and Commerce). Once affiliated to CBSE, the school chain is currently running independently and not under any board as of December 2022. Delhi Public School may refer to:

 Delhi Public School Society, a chain of more than 200 private schools in India and other countries
 Delhi Public School Rohini, New Delhi, India
 Delhi Public School, Abohar, Abohar, Punjab, India
 Delhi Public School, Azaad Nagar, Kanpur, Uttar Pradesh, India
 Delhi Public School, Bhagalpur, Bihar, India
 Delhi Public School, Bhopal, India
 Delhi Public School, Bilaspur, Tifra, Chhattisgarh, India
 Delhi Public School, Biratnagar, Nepal
 Delhi Public School, Bokaro, India
 Delhi Public School, Bopal
 Delhi Public School, Chandigarh, India
 Delhi Public School, Dhanbad, Jharkhand, India
 Delhi Public School, Dharan, Nepal
 Delhi Public School, Durg, Chhattisgarh, India
 Delhi Public School, East
 Delhi Public School, Faridabad, Haryana, India
 Delhi Public School, Gandhinagar, Ahmedabad, India
 Delhi Public School, Giridih, Jharkhand, India
 Delhi Public School, Greater Noida, Gautam Buddha Nagar, India
 Delhi Public School, Gwalior, India
 Delhi Public School, Kalyanpur, India
 Delhi Public School, Kidwai Nagar, Kanpur, India, the junior wing of DPS Barra
 Delhi Public School, Mathura Road, New Delhi, India
 Delhi Public School, New Town-Kolkata, India
 Delhi Public School, Nashik
 Delhi Public School, Patna, Bihar, India
 Delhi Public School, Pune, Maharashtra, India
 Delhi Public School, R. K. Puram, Rama Krishna Puram, New Delhi, India
 Delhi Public School, Ranchi, Jharkhand, India
 Delhi Public School, Rourkela, Odisha, India
 Delhi Public School, Servodaya Nagar, India
 Delhi Public School, Sonepat, India
 Delhi Public School, Srinagar, Athwajan, Jammu and Kashmir, India
 Delhi Public School, Varanasi, Uttar Pradesh, India
 Delhi Public School, Vasant Kunj, New Delhi, India
 Delhi Public School, Warangal
 DPS Barra, Kanpur, Uttar Pradesh, India

See also  
DPS (disambiguation)

Delhi Public School Society